South Down is a parliamentary constituency in the United Kingdom House of Commons. The current MP for the constituency is Chris Hazzard of Sinn Féin.

Constituency profile

The seat covers the Mourne Mountains, and Downpatrick to the north. It has a short border with the Republic to the south. The area voted to Remain in the EU.

Boundaries

The county constituency was first created in 1885 from the southern part of Down.  It was defined as including 'The Baronies of – Iveagh Upper, Lower Half, Lordship of Newry, and Mourne, and so much of the Barony of Iveagh Upper, Upper Half, as comprises the Parishes of – Clonallan, Donaghmore, Drumgath, Kilbroney, and Warrenpoint.'. In 1918, it was redefined as including 'The rural district of Newry No. 1; the part of the rural district of Kilkeel which is not included in the East Down Division; and the urban districts of Newcastle, Newry and Warrenpoint.' From the dissolution of Parliament in 1922, it was merged back into Down.  Maps showing the component units of the constituency can be seen here.

The seat was re-created in 1950 when the old Down two MP constituency was abolished as part of the final move to single member seats. Originally the seat consisted of most of the mid and southern parts of County Down, with the north included in North Down. It was defined as including '(i) The urban districts of Banbridge, Downpatrick, Dromore, Kilkeel, Newcastle, Newry and Warrenpoint; (ii) the rural districts of Banbridge, Downpatrick, Kilkeel, Moira and Newry No. 1.' Of the post 1973 districts, it contained all of Down and Banbridge, together with parts of Newry and Mourne, Ards and Craigavon.

In 1983 the seat was radically cut down as part of an expansion of Northern Ireland's constituencies from 12 to 17. Significant parts of the constituency were transferred to either Upper Bann or Newry and Armagh. The composition of the seat in 1983 was the entire district of Down, the Annaclone, Ballyoolymore, Croob, Dromore, Drumadonnell, Garran, Quilly and Skeagh electoral wards of Banbridge, and the Annalong, Ballycrossan, Binnian, Clonallan, Cranfield, Donaghmore, Drumgath, Kilkeel, Lisnacree, Rathfriland, Rostrevor, Seaview, and Spelga wards from Newry and Mourne.

In boundary changes proposed by a review in 1995, the seat was originally to be abolished and replaced by a new Mid Down constituency. This provoked a storm of protest and following a local enquiry minor changes were made with the seat losing one small section to Lagan Valley and another to Strangford. It still consists of parts of Down, Banbridge and Newry and Mourne districts.

In 2005, the Boundary Commission published provisional recommendations for modifying the boundaries of constituencies in Northern Ireland. For South Down, it originally proposed to add part of Newry from Newry and Armagh and the Loughbrickland part of Banbridge district from Upper Bann, while losing some more of Down to Strangford. These changes were challenged in a round of public consultations, with the result that revised recommendations were made. Under the new proposals, the Newry area remained in Newry and Armagh and Loughbrickland in Upper Bann. This meant that only 4 wards around the town of Ballynahinch were transferred to Strangford. These changes became the final recommendations and were given legal effect in 2008.

History

1885-1922
The constituency was a predominantly Nationalist area in 1918. The Unionists had significant but minority support. The Sinn Féin candidate polled poorly, probably due to the limited electoral pact to avoid seriously splitting the anti-unionist vote in seats the unionist candidate might have otherwise won.

The First Dáil
Sinn Féin contested the general election of 1918 on a platform that instead of taking up any seats they won in the United Kingdom Parliament, they would establish a revolutionary assembly in Dublin. In republican theory, every MP elected in Ireland was a potential Deputy to this assembly. In practice, only the Sinn Féin members accepted the offer and their candidate Éamon de Valera only received 0.2% of the votes in South Down, while being elected unopposed for East Clare and East Mayo; the nationalist Jeremiah McVeagh, elected as IPP MP for South Down, did not participate in the First Dáil.

In 1921, Sinn Féin decided to use the UK authorised elections for the Northern Ireland House of Commons and the House of Commons of Southern Ireland as a poll for the Irish Republic's Second Dáil. This area, in republican theory, was incorporated in a potential eight-member Dáil constituency of Down.

1950-present
When initially created, this seat had a clear unionist majority, albeit with a strong nationalist minority. However boundary changes, which have wrapped it closer around nationalist heartlands near Downpatrick and the Mournes have transformed South Down into a safe nationalist seat.

The House of Commons seat was consistently held by the Ulster Unionist Party from its creation until 1987. In the October 1974 general election the former Conservative MP Enoch Powell defended the seat for the UUP, representing a coup for them as they gained the support of a high-profile English politician, offering them a spokesperson to the United Kingdom as a whole.

Powell advocated a policy of integration for Northern Ireland whereby all forms of devolution would be wound up and the province governed as an integral part of the United Kingdom. As part of this, he campaigned for the province to have the same ratio of MPs to population as in the rest of the United Kingdom, rather than fewer, which had previously been justified due to the existence of the devolved Stormont Parliament. Powell was successful in this, but a side effect was that in his own constituency; a significant block of unionist voters were removed, resulting in a nationalist majority. Powell managed to survive for two election cycles due to a split nationalist vote, but in 1987, he narrowly lost to Eddie McGrady of the Social Democratic and Labour Party, who held the seat until he retired in 2010.

Since then, the unionist vote has declined further due to boundary changes, which excluded mainly unionist Dromore and Saintfield, and a trend for many unionists to tactically vote for the SDLP at Westminster elections to avoid the seat falling to Sinn Féin. However, in 2017, Sinn Féin gained the constituency for the first time with Chris Hazzard defeating former leader of the SDLP Margaret Ritchie as part of the SDLP's parliamentary wipeout at that year's snap general election.

The winning vote share in 2019 was the smallest of the 650 nationwide; it was just under  of the total votes that were cast.

Members of Parliament
The Member of Parliament since the 2017 general election has been Chris Hazzard of Sinn Féin. He succeeded SDLP MP Margaret Ritchie.

In this section by-elections are indicated by an asterisk after the date and italic type.

Elections

Elections in the 2010s

This seat saw the largest decrease in vote share for the SDLP at the 2019 general election.

Elections in the 2000s

Elections in the 1990s

Elections in the 1980s

Elections in the 1970s

Elections in the 1960s

Elections in the 1950s

Elections in the 1910s

Elections in the 1900s

Elections in the 1890s

Elections in the 1880s

See also
 List of parliamentary constituencies in Northern Ireland

References

Further reading
Guardian Unlimited Politics (Election results from 1992 to the present)
http://www.psr.keele.ac.uk/ (Election results from 1951 to the present)

F. W. S. Craig, British Parliamentary Election Results 1950 – 1970
The Liberal Year Book For 1917, Liberal Publication Department
The Constitutional Year Book For 1912, Conservative Central Office
The Constitutional Year Book For 1894, Conservative Central Office

External links 
Politics Resources (Election results from 1922 onwards)
Electoral Calculus (Election results from 1955 onwards)
2017 Election House Of Commons Library 2017 Election report
A Vision Of Britain Through Time (Constituency elector numbers)
 https://www.oireachtas.ie/en/members/

Politics of County Down
Westminster constituencies in County Down (historic)
Dáil constituencies in Northern Ireland (historic)
Constituencies of the Parliament of the United Kingdom established in 1885
Constituencies of the Parliament of the United Kingdom disestablished in 1922
Constituencies of the Parliament of the United Kingdom established in 1950
Westminster Parliamentary constituencies in Northern Ireland
1885 establishments in Ireland
1950 establishments in Northern Ireland